Roseomitra millepunctata is a species of sea snail, a marine gastropod mollusk in the family Mitridae, the miters or miter snails.

Description
Members of the order Neogastropoda are mostly gonochoric and broadcast spawners. Embryos develop into planktonic trocophore larvae and later into juvenile veligers before becoming fully grown adults

Distribution
This species occurs in the Philippines and the Andaman Islands.

References

 Poppe G.T. (2008) New Fissurellidae, Epitoniidae, Aclididae, Mitridae and Costellariidae from the Philippines. Visaya 2(3): 37-63

External links
 Sowerby, G. B. III. (1889). Descriptions of fourteen new species of shells from China, Japan, and the Andaman Islands, chiefly collected by Deputy Surgeon-Gen. R. Hungerford. Proceedings of the Zoological Society of London. 56: 565-570, pl. 28
 Fedosov A., Puillandre N., Herrmann M., Kantor Yu., Oliverio M., Dgebuadze P., Modica M.V. & Bouchet P. (2018). The collapse of Mitra: molecular systematics and morphology of the Mitridae (Gastropoda: Neogastropoda). Zoological Journal of the Linnean Society. 183(2): 253-337

Mitridae
Gastropods described in 1889